The Smile of Sarajevo Theatre Festival is an international comedy theatre festival that is annually held in Sarajevo, Bosnia and Herzegovina. It was established in 2017 by a team of theatre professionals headed by Nedžad Podžić "Poćko". The festival is organized in May and lasts for 9 days. It showcases comedy theatre performances from Bosnia and Herzegovina and the Former Yugoslavia.

References

Festivals established in 2017
May events
Tourist attractions in Sarajevo
Annual events in Bosnia and Herzegovina
Theatre festivals in Bosnia and Herzegovina
Festivals in Sarajevo